The 2020–21 season, was SønderjyskE's 20th season as a professional football club and their 12th consecutive season in the Superliga, the top-flight of Danish football. In addition to the domestic league, the club is competing in this season's editions of the Danish Cup and UEFA Europa League, which they appeared in for the second time following their win in the 2019–20 Danish Cup. The season covers the period from July 2020 to 30 June 2021.

Players

Youth players in use

Transfers

In

Out

Non-competitive friendlies

Pre-season

Mid-season

Competitions

Overview

Danish Superliga

Results by matchday

Regular season

Relegation round

Matches

Danish Cup

UEFA Europa League

Statistics

Goalscorers

Last updated: 24 May 2021

Clean sheets

Last updated: 24 May 2021

References

Danish football clubs 2020–21 season